Rita Winkler is a Canadian Research Hydrologist working at the British Columbia Ministry of Forests, Lands and Natural Resource Operations

Winkler is a Registered Professional Forester (RPF) with over 35 years of experience in forestry, applied hydrology, and water-related research. Winkler was an adjunct professor at Thompson Rivers University (formerly Cariboo College) and the University of British Columbia.

Education 
Winkler received a BSF in Forest Management from the University of British Columbia (UBC) in 1978, an MSc in Forest Hydrology from the University of Alberta in 1980, and a PhD in Forest Hydrology from UBC in 2001.

Winkler says that Star Trek inspired her to become involved with science. She also benefited from the science teacher she had during seventh grade.

Awards 
Named Honorary Fellow from Okanagan College in 2016 for her work in forest hydrology.

Research 
Upper Penticton Creek Watershed Experiment.

References 

Canadian hydrologists
Women earth scientists
20th-century Canadian women scientists
Year of birth missing (living people)
Place of birth missing (living people)
Living people
University of British Columbia Faculty of Forestry alumni
University of Alberta alumni
Scientists from British Columbia
21st-century Canadian women scientists
20th-century Canadian scientists
21st-century Canadian scientists
Women hydrologists